Iván Endara (born 4 March 1988) is an Ecuadorian professional tennis player.

ATP Tournaments Finals

Titles (3)

References

External links
 
 
 

1988 births
Living people
People from Ibarra, Ecuador
Ecuadorian male tennis players
Ecuadorian expatriates in the United States
Tennis people from Florida
Tennis players at the 2011 Pan American Games
Pan American Games competitors for Ecuador
21st-century Ecuadorian people